The Belmont Chiefs were a minor league baseball team based in Lexington, North Carolina. In 1961, the Chiefs played as members of the Western Carolina League. 
The Belmont Chiefs were a minor league affiliate of the San Francisco Giants, hosting home games at Davis Park.

History
In 1961, minor league baseball play began in Belmont, North Carolina. The Belmont Chiefs began play as members in the six–team Class D level Western Carolina League. The Chiefs were a minor league affiliate of the San Francisco Giants in 1961. Belmont joined the Salisbury Braves, Statesville Owls, Lexington Indians, Shelby Colonels and Newton-Conover Twins in league play.

The Belmont Chiefs were partially owned by Jim Poole, who also began the season at the Chiefs' manager. The team began the season with a 2–22 record. On May 27, 1961, Whitey Ries replaced Poole as manager. On July 17, 1961, Ries was replaced as manager by Max Lanier.

Beginning Western Carolina League play on May 1, 1961, Belmont finished the season in 5th place in the final league standings. The Chiefs improved to go 37–39 after their 2–22 start and had a final record of 39–61. The Chiefs finished the season 24.0 games behind the 1st place Salisbury Braves in the final standings. The Belmont Chiefs folded after the 1961 season, after drawing 10,081 home fans for the season,. The Western Carolina League reduced to four teams in 1962.

Belmont, North Carolina has not hosted another minor league team.

The ballparks
The Belmont Chiefs were played minor league home games at Davis Park. Today, Davis Park is still in use as a public park with a "baseball field." Davis Park is located at 203 Park Drive, Belmont, North Carolina.

Timeline

Year–by–year record

Notable alumni

Max Lanier (1961, MGR) 2x MLB All–Star
Jim Poole (1961, MGR)
Fred Wenz (1961)

See also
Belmont Chiefs players

References

External links
 Baseball Reference

Defunct minor league baseball teams
San Francisco Giants minor league affiliates
Baseball teams disestablished in 1961
Baseball teams established in 1961
Defunct baseball teams in North Carolina
Professional baseball teams in North Carolina